Umzimkhulu Local Municipality is an administrative area in the Harry Gwala District of KwaZulu-Natal in South Africa. Umzimkhulu is a Xhosa and Zulu name meaning “Big/Great house”. Prior to the Twelfth Amendment of the Constitution of South Africa in 2005, confirmed by the Thirteenth in 2007, it was part of the Eastern Cape. 

About 90.8% of the population reside in rural areas, while the remaining 9.2% are urban based. Umzimkhulu faces severe backlogs with respect to water, sanitation and electricity provision. In addition, road infrastructure remains poor and provides only limited access to the area.

Main places
The 2001 census divided the municipality into the following main places:

Politics 

The municipal council consists of forty-three members elected by mixed-member proportional representation. Twenty-two councillors are elected by first-past-the-post voting in twenty-two wards, while the remaining twenty-one are chosen from party lists so that the total number of party representatives is proportional to the number of votes received. In the election of 1 November 2021 the African National Congress (ANC) won a majority of thirty-three seats on the council.

The following table shows the results of the election.

References

External links
 Official website

Local municipalities of the Harry Gwala District Municipality